Joeli Nabuka is a former Fijian politician, who served in the House of Representatives from 2002 to 2006.  He represented the Ba East Fijian Communal Constituency, which he won for the ruling Soqosoqo Duavata ni Lewenivanua Party (SDL) in a byelection early in 2002, to fill the vacancy caused by the death in an automobile accident of his brother Epeli Seavula, also of the SDL.

Joeli Nabuka died after a short illness on 25 November 2010. He is survived by his wife and five children.

Background and career
Nabuka was originally from the village of Nakavu in Nadi from the Naduruniu Clan.

Joeli Nabuka was a former student and later became the Principal of Lelean Memorial School. Nabuka also joined the Fiji Institute of Technology as the Registrar.

As a member of the Fijian Teachers' Association, Nabuka was appointed as research officer and his report on the Fijian Education Achievement is widely referenced by those carrying out research on the subject.

Nabuka announced on 11 February 2006 that he would be retiring from politics in parliamentary election, which was duly held on 6–13 May.  He needed the time away from politics in order to pursue a postgraduate course at the University of the South Pacific, he said.

I-Taukei Fijian members of the House of Representatives (Fiji)
People educated at Lelean Memorial School
Soqosoqo Duavata ni Lewenivanua politicians
2010 deaths
Year of birth missing
Academic staff of Fiji Institute of Technology
Fijian educators
Politicians from Nadi
20th-century Fijian educators